Attorney General Williams may refer to:

Allan Williams (politician) (1922–2011), Attorney General of British Columbia
Daniel Williams (governor-general) (born 1935), Attorney-General of Grenada
Daryl Williams (politician) (born 1942), Attorney-General of Australia
Gareth Williams, Baron Williams of Mostyn (1941–2003), Attorney General for England and Wales and Attorney General for Northern Ireland
George Henry Williams (1823–1910), Attorney General of the United States
Thomas H. Williams (California official) (1828–1886), Attorney General of California

See also
General Williams (disambiguation)